The Cabinet of Canada is a body of ministers of the Crown that, along with the Canadian monarch, and within the tenets of the Westminster system, forms the government of Canada. Chaired by the prime minister, the Cabinet is a committee of the King's Privy Council for Canada and the senior echelon of the Ministry, the membership of the Cabinet and Ministry often being co-terminal;  there were no members of the latter who were not also members of the former.

For practical reasons, the Cabinet is informally referred to either in relation to the prime minister in charge of it or the number of ministries since Confederation. The current Cabinet is the Cabinet of Justin Trudeau, which is part of the 29th Ministry. The interchangeable use of the terms cabinet and  ministry is a subtle inaccuracy that can cause confusion.

Composition

King-in-Council
The Government of Canada, formally referred to as His Majesty's Government, is defined by the constitution as the King acting on the advice of his Privy Council; what is technically known as the King-in-Council or, sometimes, the Governor-in-Council, referring to the governor general as the King's stand-in. However, the Privy Council—composed mostly of former members of parliament, current and former chief justices of Canada, and other elder statesmen—rarely meets in full; as the stipulations of responsible government require that those who directly advise the monarch and governor general on how to exercise the Royal Prerogative be accountable to the elected House of Commons, the day-to-day operation of government is guided only by a sub-group of the Privy Council made up of individuals who hold seats in Parliament. This body of ministers of the Crown is the Cabinet, which has come to be the council in the phrase King-in-Council.

In the context of constitutional monarchy and responsible government, the ministerial advice tendered is typically binding; though, it is important to note that the royal prerogative belongs to the Crown, not to any of the ministers, and the royal and viceregal figures may unilaterally use these powers in exceptional constitutional crisis situations. There are also a few duties which must be specifically performed by, or bills that require assent by, the King. Royal assent has never been denied to a law passed by the federal Parliament.

One of the main duties of the Crown is to appoint as prime minister the individual most likely to maintain the confidence of the House of Commons; this is usually the leader of the political party with a plurality of seats in that house. But, when no party or coalition holds a majority (referred to as a hung parliament), or similar scenario, the governor general's judgment about the most suitable candidate for prime minister must be brought into play. The prime minister thereafter heads the Cabinet. The King is informed by his viceroy of the acceptance of the resignation of a prime minister and the swearing-in of a new ministry and he remains fully briefed through regular communications from his Canadian ministers and holds audience with them whenever possible.

Selection and structure
The governor general appoints to the Cabinet persons chosen by the prime minister—John A. Macdonald once half-jokingly listed his occupation as cabinet maker. While there are no legal qualifications of the potential ministers, there are a number of conventions that are expected to be followed. For instance, there is typically a minister from each province, ministers from visible minority groups, female ministers, and, while the majority of those chosen to serve as ministers of the Crown are members of Parliament, a cabinet sometimes includes a senator, especially as a representative of a province or region where the governing party won few or no ridings. Efforts are further made to indulge interest groups that support the incumbent government and the party's internal politics must be appeased, with Cabinet positions sometimes being a reward for loyal party members. It is not legally necessary for Cabinet members to have a position in parliament although they are almost always selected from the House of Commons.

As with other Westminster-derived governments, but unlike the United States Cabinet, the size and structure of the Canadian Cabinet is relatively malleable, the slate of Cabinet positions tending to be substantially restructured periodically, the last major period of realignment occurring between 1993 and 1996. Throughout the 20th century, cabinets had been expanding in size until the Cabinet chaired by Brian Mulroney, with a population of 40 ministers. Mulroney's successor, Kim Campbell, reduced this number and Jean Chrétien eliminated approximately 10 members of the ministry from the Cabinet, so that, by 1994, there were a total of 23 persons in Cabinet. Under the chairmanship of Paul Martin, the number increased again to 39, in the vicinity of which it has remained. The Trudeau Cabinet comprised 37 ministers in 2021.

Cabinet itself—or full Cabinet—is further divided into committees. The Treasury Board, overseeing the expenditure of the sovereign's state funds within every department, is one of the most important of these. The structure of Cabinet fluctuates between and within ministries. For example, the Priorities and Planning Committee, often referred to as the inner Cabinet, was the body that set the strategic directions for the government under Stephen Harper, approving key appointments and ratifying committee memberships. This committee ceased to exist under Justin Trudeau. Other Cabinet committees common across committee structures include operations, social affairs, a committee focused on economic growth, foreign affairs and security, the environment, and energy security. Each committee is chaired by a senior minister whose own portfolio may intersect with the mandate of the committee.

Ministers, secretaries, and deputies
 

Each minister of the Crown is responsible for the general administration of at least one government portfolio and heads a corresponding ministry or ministries, known in Canada as departments or agencies. The most important minister, following the first minister, is the minister of finance, while other high-profile ministries include foreign affairs, industry, justice, and health. The official order of precedence does not follow the same pattern, however, with ministers being listed in the order of their appointment to the Privy Council; if appointed on the same day, the individuals are placed in order of their election or appointment to Parliament.

Unique positions in Cabinet are those such as leader of the government in the House of Commons and president of the King's Privy Council, who have no corresponding department and some ministers, such as the minister for international cooperation, head agencies under the umbrella of a department run by another minister. Further, the prime minister may recommend the governor general appoint to Cabinet some ministers without portfolio, which was last done in 2021, when Prime Minister Trudeau advised the appointment of Jim Carr as Special Representative to the Prairies. Unlike in many other Westminster model governments, ministers of state in Canada are considered full members of Cabinet, rather than of the ministry outside it, which has the effect of making the Canadian Cabinet much larger than its foreign counterparts. These individuals are assigned specific, but temporary, responsibilities on a more ad hoc basis, fulfilling tasks created and dissolved to suit short-term government priorities from within a department under a full minister of the Crown. Ministers of state may also be named, but not specified any particular responsibilities, thus giving them the effective appearance of ministers without portfolio, or be delegated problems or initiatives that cut across departmental boundaries, a situation usually described as having the [situation] file.

Members of the Cabinet receive assistance from both parliamentary secretaries—who will usually answer, on behalf of a minister, questions in the House of Commons—and deputy ministers—senior civil servants assigned to each ministry in order to tender non-partisan advice.

Responsibilities

Composed of advisors to the sovereign, the Cabinet has significant power in the Canadian system and, as the governing party usually holds a majority of seats in the legislature, almost all bills proposed by the Cabinet are enacted. Combined with a comparatively small proportion of bills originating with individual members of Parliament, this leads to Cabinet having almost total control over the legislative agenda of the House of Commons. Further, under the constitution, all legislation involving the raising or spending of public revenue must originate from the Cabinet.

Members of various executive agencies, heads of Crown corporations, and other officials are appointed by the Crown-in-Council; though, some of these may be made only by the Governor General-in-Council, specifically. Royal commissions and public inquiries are also called through a royal warrant issued by the King or Governor-in-Council.

All Cabinet meetings are held behind closed doors and the minutes are kept confidential for 30 years, Cabinet members being forbidden from discussing what transpires. Decisions made must be unanimous; though, this often occurs at the prime minister's direction and, once a decision has been reached, all Cabinet members must publicly support it. If any of these rules are violated, the offending minister is usually removed by the prime minister and, if the disagreement within the Cabinet is strong, a minister may resign, as did John Turner in 1975, over the subject of wage and price controls, and Michael Chong in 2006, over a parliamentary motion recognizing "the Québécois" as a nation within Canada.

However, the Cabinet's collective influence has been seen to be eclipsed by that of the prime minister alone. Former Prime Minister Pierre Trudeau is credited with consolidating power in the Office of the Prime Minister (PMO) and, at the end of the 20th century and into the 21st, analysts, such as Jeffrey Simpson, Donald Savoie, and John Gomery, argued that both Parliament and the Cabinet had become overshadowed by prime ministerial power. Savoie quoted an anonymous minister from the Liberal Party as saying Cabinet had become "a kind of focus group for the prime minister," while Simpson called cabinet a "mini-sounding board". Coyne wrote in 2015: "Cabinet does not matter [...] It does not govern: that is the job of the prime minister and of the group of political staff he has around him, and of the bureaucracy beyond them." John Robson criticised the use of the prime minister's name to identify the Cabinet, calling it a "bad habit" that "endorses while concealing the swollen pretension of the executive branch."

Shadow cabinets
Each party in His Majesty's Loyal Opposition creates a shadow cabinet, with each member thereof observing and critiquing one or more corresponding, actual Cabinet portfolios and offering alternative policies. The Official Opposition's shadow cabinet comprises members of the party holding the second-largest number of seats and is appointed by the leader of the Opposition; it is generally regarded as a "government in waiting". Its members are often, but not always, appointed to a Cabinet post, should the leader of their party be called to form a government.

Current Cabinet

The Liberal Party of Canada won the federal election of October 19, 2015, with a majority of seats in the House of Commons. The Cabinet, within the 29th Canadian Ministry, was sworn-in on November 4, with Justin Trudeau appointed as prime minister.

The swearing-in of the new Cabinet also marked the first gender-balanced Cabinet in Canada's history, wherein an equal number of female and male ministers (15 of each, including the Prime Minister) were appointed. Trudeau has continued to maintain a gender-balanced Cabinet throughout several Cabinet shuffles during his time in office and added five new ministerial positions.

Initially, five members of Cabinet were appointed by orders-in-council as ministers of state, but styled without the traditional of state in their titles. These were the Ministers of Science, Small Business and Tourism, Sport and Persons with Disabilities, Status of Women, and La Francophonie. (However, the new Minister of La Francophonie was, at the same time, appointed Minister of International Development.) Ministers of state had previously represented a second order within the Cabinet (determined by a lower salary as defined by the Salaries Act, despite the Ministries and Ministers of State Act giving them full authority for any government function delegated to them. However, after details of the aforementioned orders-in-council were published, the new Cabinet stated its intent for there to "be no levels of Cabinet members" and it would table in Parliament amendments to the salary statutes, but also that the new ministers would continue to work with the existing departments rather than forming new ones.

On July 18, 2018, Trudeau reshuffled his cabinet. This included adding five new ministry positions, expanding the size of Cabinet 35. The Prime Minister shuffled Cabinet again on October 26, 2021, following the federal election that year, increasing Cabinet's membership to 39, thus upsetting the gender balance.

Ministers are listed according to the Canadian order of precedence:

 Notes

Former portfolios 

Minister of Border Security and Organized Crime Reduction (2018–2019)
Secretary of State for the Provinces (1867–1873)
Minister of Public Works (1867–1996)
Postmaster General (1867–1981)
Minister of Customs (1867–1918)
Minister of Inland Revenue (1867–1918)
Secretary of State for Canada (1867–1996)
Minister of Marine and Fisheries (1867–1930)
Superintendent-General Indian Affairs (1868–1936)
Minister of the Interior (1873–1936)
Solicitor General (1892–2003)
Minister of Mines (1907–1936)
Secretary of State for External Affairs (1909–1993)
Minister of Immigration and Colonization (1917–1936)
Minister of Soldiers' Civil Re-establishment (1918–1928)
Minister of Customs and Inland Revenue (1918–1921)
Minister of Customs and Excise (1921–1927)
Minister of Pensions and National Health (1928–1944)
Minister of Fisheries (1930–1971)
Minister of Mines and Resources (1936–1950)
Minister of Mines and Technical Surveys (1950–1966)
Minister of Resources and Development (1950–1953)
Minister of Citizenship and Immigration (1950–1966)
Minister of Northern Affairs and National Resources (1953–1966)
Minister of Manpower and Immigration (1966–1977)
Minister of Energy, Mines and Resources (1966–1995)
Minister of Consumer and Corporate Affairs (1968–1995)
Leader of the Government in the Senate (list) (1969–2013)
Minister of Regional Economic Expansion (1969–1982)
Minister of Economic Communications (1969–1996)
Minister of Supply and Services (1969–1996)
Minister of Industry, Trade and Commerce (1969–1983)
Minister of Employment and Immigration (1977–1996)
Minister of Regional Industrial Expansion (1984–1990)
Minister of Forestry (1990–1995)
Minister of National Health and Welfare (1944–1996)
Minister of Industry, Science and Technology (1990–1995)
Minister responsible for Constitutional Affairs (1991–1993)
Minister of Multiculturalism and Citizenship (1991–1996)
Minister of Human Resources Development (1996–2003)

See also

 List of Canadian ministries
 Structure of the Canadian federal government

Notes

References

Citations

Sources

External links 
 Reference to current cabinet ministers
 Cabinet Minister responsibilities

 
Government of Canada
Canada
Westminster system